= 12 IPA 4 =

Indonesian teen drama television series

- Genre: Teen drama
- Created by: Oswin Bonifanz
- Directed by: Dinna Jasanti
- Starring: Junior Roberts; Nayla D. Purnama; Sandy Pradana; Catherine Alicia
- Country of origin: Indonesia
- Original language: Indonesian
- No. of seasons: 1
- No. of episodes: 8

Production
- Producer: Oswin Bonifanz
- Camera setup: Multi-camera
- Production company: Unlimited Production

Original release
- Network: WeTV
- Release: 24 July – 5 September 2026

12 IPA 4 is an Indonesian television series produced by Unlimited Production which premiere on 24 July 2026 on WeTV. It starring Junior Roberts, Nayla Purnama, Sandy Pradana, and Catherine Alicia.

== Plot ==
After the sudden death of her twin sister, Hanin discovers a diary containing Hana's final dream and secrets about her life at Sirius High School.

To fulfill her dream, Hanin disguises herself as Hana and enters Sirius High School. Unfortunately, in her disguise, Hanin finds herself trapped in the absurd lives of 12th-grade science students and becomes involved in a love triangle with Joan and Jarvis, two handsome men who each harbor their own charms and mysteries.

== Cast ==
- Junior Roberts as Jarvis
- Nayla D. Purnama as Hanandya Maheshwari/Hanin
- Sandy Pradana as Joan
- Catherine Alicia as Arabella
- Sheryl Jesslyn as Lana
- Denzel Noah as Gavriel
- Sheva Audrey as Welda
- Mahesa Koenen as Harka
- Joseph Halim as Arsenio
- Jinan Safa as Nadia
- Jessica Shaina as Alea
- Ratu Aulia as Jema
- Alika Dinda as Milda
- Chelcy Clarissa as Yoriko
- Catherine Alicia as Arabella
- Zidni Hakim as Arya
- Dahlia Poland as Mira
- Nadila Ernesta as Mutia

== Productions ==
=== Development ===
In April 2026, We TV announced a new series titled 12 IPA 4.

=== Casting ===
Nayla Purnama was confirmed to play dual role, Hana and Hanin. Junior Roberts was signed to play Jarvis. Jinan Safa was roped for the role of Nadia. Catherine Alicia enters as Arabella, marks her acting debut.
